Birania or Biraniya or Biraniyan is a village in Fatehpur tehsil of Sikar district of Rajasthan. It is located 12 kilometres to the west of Fatehpur. National Highway-11 passes at the distance of about 12 km from the village. Adjoining villages are Karanga Bara, Karanga Chhota, Sulkhania, Rosawa, Kishanpura, and Thathawata Piran.

The village was founded by Biran and was called Birania after her name.

Villages in Sikar district